The KYA San Francisco International Pop Festival was held at the Alameda County Fairgrounds on Saturday October 26 and Sunday October 27, 1968.

Groups
The groups playing at the festival included (in alphabetical order):

 The Animals
 Canned Heat
 The Chambers Brothers
 Creedence Clearwater Revival
 Deep Purple
 José Feliciano
 Fraternity of Man
 The Grass Roots
 Iron Butterfly
 The Loading Zone
 Buddy Miles
 Procol Harum
 Rejoice 
 Johnny Rivers

History
The San Francisco International Pop Festival was rescheduled from Searsville Lake, San Mateo County, CA October 5-6, 1968.

See also
List of music festivals in the United States
List of historic rock festivals
List of pop festivals

References

External links
 Wolfgang's Vault Event Handbill

Rock festivals in the United States
Festivals in the San Francisco Bay Area
1968 in California
Counterculture festivals
Music festivals established in 1968
Pop music festivals in the United States
1968 music festivals